Buffalo Valley may refer to:

Buffalo Valley (Nevada), a valley in Nevada
Buffalo Valley, Lewis County, Tennessee, an unincorporated community
Buffalo Valley, Putnam County, Tennessee, an unincorporated community